United Nations Security Council resolution 1555, adopted unanimously on 29 July 2004, after recalling all previous resolutions on the situation in the Democratic Republic of the Congo, including resolutions 1493 (2003) and 1533 (2004), the Council extended the mandate of the United Nations Mission in the Democratic Republic of Congo (MONUC) until 1 October 2004.

The Security Council reaffirmed its support for the transitional government of the Democratic Republic of the Congo and the peace process. It expressed concern at tensions and hostilities in the east of the country, particularly conflicts in Ituri, North Kivu and South Kivu.

Extending MONUC's mandate, the Council further requested the Secretary-General Kofi Annan to report before 16 August 2004 on the implementation of MONUC's mandate.

See also
 Kivu conflict
 Ituri conflict
 List of United Nations Security Council Resolutions 1501 to 1600 (2003–2005)
 Second Congo War

References

External links
 
Text of the Resolution at undocs.org

 1555
2004 in the Democratic Republic of the Congo
 1555
July 2004 events